The Egypt–Gaza border is the  long border between the Gaza Strip and Egypt.

The Rafah Border Crossing is the only crossing point between Egypt and the Gaza Strip. It is located on the international border that was confirmed in the 1979 Egypt–Israel peace treaty. Only passage of persons takes place through the Rafah Border Crossing; as such, the Egypt-Gaza border is only open to the passage of people, not of goods. All cargo traffic must go through Israel, usually through the Israeli-controlled Kerem Shalom border crossing on the Gaza–Israel barrier.

Background 
On 1 October 1906, the Ottoman and British governments agreed on a boundary between Ottoman ruled Palestine and British ruled Egypt, running from Taba to Rafah. Although after World War I Palestine was also under British control, the  Egypt-Palestine boundary was maintained to control the movement of the local Bedouin. From 1948, Gaza was occupied by an independent Egypt. Consequently, the border between the Gaza Strip and Egypt proper was a mere administrative boundary without border control. In the 1967 Six-Day War, Israel conquered the Sinai Peninsula and the Gaza Strip from Egypt, and again there was nominal border control.

In 1979, Israel and Egypt signed a peace treaty that returned the Sinai, which borders the Gaza Strip, to Egyptian control. As part of that treaty, a 100-meter-wide strip of land, known as the Philadelphi Route, was established as a buffer zone between the Gaza Strip and Egypt. In the peace treaty, the re-created Gaza–Egypt border was drawn across the city of Rafah. When Israel withdrew from the Sinai in 1982, Rafah was divided into Egyptian and Palestinian parts, splitting up families, separated by barbed-wire barriers.

Buffer zone  by Israel
Under the 1979 Egypt–Israel peace treaty, the Philadelphi Route buffer zone was a 100-meter-wide strip of land along the Gaza–Egypt border. Until 2000, the actual buffer zone was 20–40 meters wide with a 2.5 to 3 metres high concrete wall topped with barbed wire.

During the Second Intifada, which began in 2000, Israel widened the buffer zone to 200–300 meters and built a barrier wall mostly of corrugated sheet metal, with stretches of concrete topped with barbed wire. The construction of the buffer zone required the demolition of entire blocks of houses at the main entrance to Rafah's central thoroughfare.

2001–03 expansion 

Since 2001, the IDF demolished Palestinian houses in Rafah to create the buffer zone. In 2002, hundreds of houses in Rafah were destroyed to widen the buffer zone and for the building of an eight meter high and 1.6 kilometres long metal wall along the border. The wall also extended two meters underground. The wall was built about 80–90 meters from the border, which doubled the width of the patrol corridor. After the metal wall was completed in early 2003, demolitions continued and even increased dramatically.

2004 expansion, Operation Rainbow 
After the death on 12 May 2004 of five Israeli soldiers who were operating in the buffer zone, the Israel government approved on 13 May a plan to further widen the buffer zone, which would require the demolition of hundreds of homes. The Israeli military recommended demolishing all homes within 300 meters of its positions, or about 400 meters from the border. The plan elicited strong international criticism.

On 14 May, a large IDF force entered the "Brazil block" of Rafah and in heavy fighting, as reported by UNWRA, 12 Palestinians were killed and 52 injured. Israeli forces began demolishing houses in the Qishta neighbourhood. and destroyed scores of houses. Around midnight the same day, the Israeli High Court of Justice issued an interim order, temporarily barring the IDF from demolishing homes in the refugee camp, if the action was not part of "a regular military operation".  Nevertheless, the IDF continued the destruction of homes until 15 May 5:00 a.m. because of "immediate military necessity, a risk to soldiers, or a hindrance to a military operation", raising the number of destroyed houses to just over 100.

On 16 May, the High Court ruled that the IDF may destroy homes according to their needs; the IDF had pledged that it would refrain from unnecessarily demolishing houses. The next day, Israel started Operation Rainbow.

On 18 May, the Israel government declared that the plan to widen a buffer zone along the Egyptian border was cancelled, while the same day the army massively invaded Rafah and continued its large-scale destruction. On 19 May 2004, the United Nations Security Council condemned the killing of Palestinian civilians and the demolition of homes.

Between 1 April 2003 and 30 April 2004, 106 houses were demolished in Rafah. According to HRW, the IDF's justifications for the destruction were doubtful and rather consistent with the goal of having a wide and empty border area to facilitate long-term control over the Gaza Strip.

2005 expansion 
An army plan to dig a moat along the border was dropped in 2005 after it became clear that it would likely be rejected by Israel's Attorney General, Menachem Mazuz, because it required the destruction of 3,000 more homes in Rafah. Instead, the IDF started the building of a 7–9 meters high (about 20–30 feet) concrete wall along the border in a 60–100 meter (about 200–300 feet) wide security strip, equipped with electronic sensors and underground concrete barriers to prevent tunnelling.

Buffer zone  by Egypt

2009 Egyptian steel wall 
In December 2009, Egypt started with help from the US, the building of an Egypt–Gaza barrier along the Gaza border, consisting of a steel wall.

2013–15 Egyptian demolition of homes and smuggling tunnels
In October 2014 Egypt announced that they planned to expand the buffer zone between Gaza and Egypt, following a terrorist attack from Gaza that killed 31 Egyptian soldiers. The buffer was created "in a move meant to halt the passage of weapons and militants through cross-border smuggling tunnels but which also puts more pressure on the Palestinian militant Hamas group."

Egyptian authorities ordered residents living along the country's eastern border to evacuate their homes prior to their demolishing. The buffer zone will include water-filled trenches to thwart tunnel diggers and will be 500 meter wide and extended along the 13 km border. Following the announcement of Ibrahim Mahlab, the Prime Minister of Egypt, that any residents unwilling to move wilfully would be forcefully removed from their homes, many residents left the area. On 17 November 2014, Egypt announced that the buffer zone would be doubled to 1 km due to the longer than expected tunnels discovered.

Palestinian President Mahmoud Abbas agreed with the operation, arguing that the smuggling tunnels under the border had produced 1,800 millionaires, and were used for smuggling weapons, drugs, cash and equipment for forging documents. Abbas had previously recommended the sealing or destruction of the tunnels by flooding them and then punishing the owners of the homes that contained entrances to the tunnels, including demolishing their homes.

On 8 January 2015, Egypt's expansion resulted in the destruction of about 1,220 homes, while destroying more than 1,600 tunnels. Some tunnels discovered ranged over 1 kilometre long and contained lighting, ventilation and phone systems. The total cost of this phase of the buffer zone is expected to cost $70 million. In February 2015, in response to the buffer zone, ISIS beheaded 10 men they believed were spies for Mossad and the Egyptian Army.

In June 2015, Egypt completed its digging of a ditch at the Rafah Crossing Point, 20 meters wide by 10 meters deep. It is located two kilometres from the border with Gaza outside of Rafah City and part of the enlarged buffer zone. Expansion of the trench along with watchtowers was planned.

On 11 September 2015, the Egyptian army began to pump water from the Mediterranean Sea into the tunnels. According to the Egyptian president Abdel Fatah Al-Sisi, flooding of the tunnels had been carried out in coordination with the Palestinian Authority. A number of Palestinian factions condemned the flooding of the border with sea water, because it posed a serious threat to environment and ground water. In November 2015, indeed large areas of soil collapsed as a result of the flooding, threatening Gazan homes in Rafah near the Saladin Gate. Salty water flowed out from the ground, contaminating the soil and make it unusable for agriculture. The seawater further damages the natural aquifers, "already depleted by the Israelis, who dig wells thousands of metres deeper than ours".

According to Human Rights Watch, the Egyptian authorities demolished between July 2013 and August 2015 at least 3,255 residential, commercial, administrative, and community buildings along the border, forcibly evicting thousands of people.

Rafah Border Crossing 

The Rafah Border Crossing is the only crossing point between Egypt and the Gaza Strip. It lies on the international border that was confirmed by the 1979 Egypt–Israel peace treaty and the 1982 Israeli withdrawal from the Sinai Peninsula. The Rafah Border Crossing can only be used for the passage of persons. All goods traffic must use the Kerem Shalom border crossing on the Israel-Gaza border.

See also 
Egypt–Gaza barrier
Israel–Gaza barrier
Kerem Shalom border crossing

References

 
Borders of Egypt
International borders